Rumour Has It is a novel by British author Jill Mansell. Rumour Has It, spent eight weeks in The Sunday Times hardback bestseller list in 2009  and the paperback ranked third in The Sunday Times bestseller list

Background
Jill Mansell first had the idea for becoming a novelist after reading an article in a magazine about women who had changed their lives by becoming best-selling authors. Eventually she decided to write the kind of book "I would love to read". The end result was her first novel, Fast Friends.

Characters in Rumour Has It
 Tilly Cole
 Jack Lucas

Release details 
 2009, UK, Headline Review, pub date 5 February 2009, hardback
 2009, UK, Headline Review, pub date 25 June 2009, paperback
 2009, UK, Headline Review, pub date 3 May 2009, E-book

References

2009 British novels
Romantic comedy novels
British romance novels
Contemporary romance novels
Headline Publishing Group books